The 2018 Thai League Cup is the 9th season in the second era of a Thailand's knockout football competition. All games are played as a single match. It was sponsored by Toyota, and known as the Toyota League Cup for sponsorship purposes. 82 clubs were accepted into the tournament, and it began with the first qualification round on 28 February 2018, and concluded with the final on 20 October 2018. The tournament has been readmitted back into Thai football after a 10-year absence. The prize money for this prestigious award is said to be around 5 million baht and the runners-up will be netting 1 million baht.

The prize money is not the only benefit of this cup, the team winning the fair play spot will get a Hilux Vigo. The MVP of the competition will get a Toyota Camry Hybrid Car. The winner would have qualified for the 2018 Mekong Club Championship final and the 2019 Toyota Premier Cup.

This is the first edition of the competition and the qualifying round will be played in regions featuring clubs from the Thai League 3 and Thai League 4.

Calendar

Results
Note: T1: Clubs from Thai League 1; T2: Clubs from Thai League 2; T3: Clubs from Thai League 3; T4: Clubs from Thai League 4; T5: Clubs from Thailand Amateur League.

First qualification round
There were seventeen clubs from 2018 Thai League 3 and thirty-three clubs from 2018 Thai League 4 have signed to qualifying in 2018 Thai League cup. Qualification round had drawn on 21 February 2018 by FA Thailand.

Upper region
The qualifying round will be played in regions featuring clubs from the 2018 Thai League 4 Northern Region, 2018 Thai League 4 North Eastern Region, some of the 2018 Thai League 4 Western Region, 2018 Thai League 4 Bangkok Metropolitan Region, and 2018 Thai League 3 Upper Region.

Lower region
The qualifying round will be played in regions featuring clubs from 2018 Thai League 4 Eastern Region, some of the 2018 Thai League 4 Western Region, 2018 Thai League 4 Southern Region and 2018 Thai League 3 Lower Region.

Second qualification round
The second qualifying round will be featured by twenty-two clubs which were the winners of first qualification round. There were three clubs which were the winners of the previous round had passed to qualification play-off round automatically by drawing; including Nan, Hua Hin City, and Surat Thani.

Upper region
The qualifying round will be played in regions featuring clubs from the 2018 Thai League 4 Northern Region, 2018 Thai League 4 North Eastern Region, 2018 Thai League 4 Bangkok Metropolitan Region, and 2018 Thai League 3 Upper Region.

Lower region
The qualifying round will be played in regions featuring clubs from 2018 Thai League 4 Eastern Region, 2018 Thai League 4 Western Region, 2018 Thai League 4 Southern Region and 2018 Thai League 3 Lower Region.

Qualification play-off round
The qualification play-off round will be featured by eleven clubs which were the winners of second qualification round, three clubs which were the winners of first qualification round that advanced to this round automatically by drawing, and fourteen clubs from 2018 Thai League 2. Qualification play-off round had drawn on 27 March 2018 by FA Thailand.

First round
The first round will be featured by fourteen clubs which were the winners of the qualification play-off round; including eleven clubs from T2, two clubs from T3, and one club from T4 and eighteen clubs from 2018 Thai League. First round had drawn on 22 May 2018 by FA Thailand.

Second round
The second round will be featured by sixteen clubs which were the winners of the first round; including thirteen clubs from T1, two clubs from T3, and one club from T4. Second round had drawn on 19 June 2018 by FA Thailand.

Quarter-finals
The quarter-finals round will be featured by eight clubs which were the winners of the second round; including seven clubs from T1 and one club from T3. Quarter-finals round had drawn on 17 July 2018 by FA Thailand.

Semi-finals
The semi-finals round will be featured by four clubs which were the winners of the quarter-finals round; all are the clubs from T1. Semi-finals round had drawn on 14 August 2018 by FA Thailand.

Final

The final round will be featured by two clubs which were the winners of the semi-finals round; both are the clubs from T1. It was played at the Thammasat Stadium in Pathum Thani, Thailand on 20 October 2018.

Top goalscorers
As of 20 October 2018 from official website.

See also
 2018 Thai League 1
 2018 Thai League 3
 2018 Thai League 4
 2018 Thailand Amateur League
 2018 Thai FA Cup
 2018 Thai League Cup
 2018 Thailand Champions Cup

References

External links
 http://www.smmsport.com/reader.php?news=211012
 http://www.smmsport.com/reader.php?news=211627
 http://www.thailandsusu.com/webboard/index.php?topic=389986.0
 http://www.smmsport.com/reader.php?news=212049
 http://www.thailandsusu.com/webboard/index.php?topic=390111.0
 http://www.smmsport.com/reader.php?news=212291
 official 2018 Thai league cup result
 http://www.smmsport.com/reader.php?news=213245
 http://www.smmsport.com/reader.php?news=214314
 http://www.thailandsusu.com/webboard/index.php?topic=390969.0
 http://www.smmsport.com/reader.php?news=216314
 https://www.thaileague.co.th/official/t4/?r=News/NewsRead&id=4060
 http://www.smmsport.com/reader.php?news=219365
 https://www.thaileague.co.th/official/?r=Tournament/LeagueCup&iSeason=3
 https://www.siamsport.co.th/jleague/content/590/

2018 in Thai football cups
Thailand League Cup
Thailand League Cup
2018
2018